The Test of Donald Norton is a 1926 American silent Western film starring George Walsh and Tyrone Power and directed by B. Reeves Eason.

Synopsis
Donald Norton, a man of mixed race, grew up under the care of the Layards. He becomes the manager of a fur trading post for Hudson's Bay Company but has some struggles when he goes to be reassigned. Donald becomes ill one winter and his post manager, Dale Millington, takes advantage of his absence to impugn Donald's loyalty to the company. Donald is fired by his district manager, John Corrigal. In an argument with Corrigal, Donald becomes convinced that Corrigal is his father.

After taking a post in a rival company, Donald hears his mother has almost choked to death. Both he and Corrigal rush to her side, but she dies before she can clear up the paternity mystery. Millington abducts the Layards' daughter and Donald's love, Janet, but Donald brings them back to the post. Millington tells the story that he heard from Donald's mother. She had burned down Corrigal's house and taken his son, John Corrigal, Jr. Corrigal hugs his son, Donald, and his soon to be daughter-in-law, Janet.

Cast
 George Walsh - Wen-dah-ben, aka Donald Norton
 Tyrone Power Sr. - John Corrigal 
 Robert Graves - Dale Millington
 Eugenia Gilbert - Lorraine
 Evelyn Selbie - Nee-tah-wee-gan
 Michael D. Moore - Wendahban, as a boy
 Virginia True Boardman
 John Francis Dillon 
 Virginia Marshall

References

External links
 
 The Test of Donald Norton @ IMDb.com

1926 films
1926 Western (genre) films
Films directed by B. Reeves Eason
Northern (genre) films
American black-and-white films
Silent American Western (genre) films
1920s American films